Lithuania competed at the 2018 Winter Olympics in Pyeongchang, South Korea, from 9 to 25 February 2018, with five competitors in three sports.

On January 19, 2018, biathlete Tomas Kaukėnas was named as the country's flag bearer during the opening ceremony.

Competitors
The following is the list of number of competitors participating at the Games per sport/discipline.

Alpine skiing 

Lithuania qualified at least two quotas for alpine skiing

Biathlon 

Based on their Nations Cup ranking in the 2016–17 Biathlon World Cup, Lithuania qualified 2 men and 2 women.

Cross-country skiing 

Lithuania qualified three cross-country skiers.

Distance

Sprint

References

Nations at the 2018 Winter Olympics
2018
Winter Olympics